Columbia round open was held between 1960 and 1968, both men and women competed.

Men's Columbia round open

Men's Columbia round team open

Women's Columbia round open 
 

Defunct events at the Summer Paralympics
Archery at the Summer Paralympics